David Rubinstein (7 August 1932 – 19 August 2019) was a social historian born of Jewish parentage in Cleveland Heights, Ohio. His father Beryl Rubinstein was a musician.

Biography 
Rubinstein moved to England in 1952 to study for a PhD at London School of Economics where his doctoral thesis was on The decline of the Liberal Party 1880-1900 He then moved to the University of Hull. He lived in Tours for years and latterly lived in York, England, where he was an honorary fellow of the University of York.

He specialized in the 19th and 20th centuries and authored approximately 20 books.

Rubinstein was a member of the Religious Society of Friends and a Quaker author.

He died in 2019.

Publications
A selection of Rubinstein's work:
 1969: The Evolution of the Comprehensive School, 1926-1966 (Authored with Brian Simon. London: Routledge) 
 1969: Leisure Transport and the Countryside (Authored with Colin Speakman. London: Fabian Society) 
 1969: School Attendance in London, 1870-1904: A Social History (New York: A.M. Kelley) 
 1970: Education for Democracy (Edited with Colin Stoneman. New York: Penguin) 
 1972: Psychotherapy of Schizophrenia (Authored with Yrjo O. Alanen)
 1972: The Wold's Way
 1973: People for the People: Radical Ideas & Personalities in British Social History (London: Ithaca Press) 
 1974: Victorian Homes (North Pomfret, VT: David & Charles) 
 1980: Education and Equality
 1981: Marx and Wittgenstein: Social Praxis and Social Explanation
 1986: Before the Suffragettes: Women's Emancipation in the 1890s (Brighton, Sussex, UK: Harvester) 
 1991: A Different World for Women: The Life of Millicent Garrett Fawcett (New York: Harvester Wheatsheaf) 
 1999: But He'll Remember: An Autobiography. William Sessions Limited 1999: York Friends and the Great War (York, UK: Borthwick Institute of Historical Research)
 2000: Culture, Structure and Agency: Toward a Truly Multidimensional Sociology 2005: The Labour Party and British Society, 1880–2005 (Brighton, UK: Sussex Academic Press) 
 2006: An Inquiry into the Philosophical Foundations of the Human Sciences (Authored with Alfred Claassen. San Francisco State University Series in Philosophy)
 2009: The Backhouse Quaker Family of York Nurserymen: Including James Backhouse, 1794-1869, Botanist and Quaker Missionary 2009: The Nature of the World: The Yorkshire Philosophical Society, 1822-2000'' (York, UK: Quacks)

References

1932 births
2019 deaths
Jewish American historians
Alumni of the London School of Economics
Academics of the University of Hull
American male non-fiction writers
Social historians
American Quakers
20th-century American historians
20th-century American male writers
21st-century American historians
21st-century American male writers
People from Cleveland Heights, Ohio
Historians from Ohio
21st-century American Jews